Central High School (CHS) is a suburban public school located in Phenix City, Alabama. Offering grades 10 through 12, Central Phenix City is the only high school in the Phenix City School District. CHS is connected by one freshman academy, an eighth grade school, and eight elementary schools. The school district is located in the counties of Lee and Russell and neighbor the Russell County School District and the Lee County School District. Some neighboring high schools include but are not limited to: Russell County High School and Smiths Station High School. Central High School served 1,551 students through the 2022–2023 school year. 10% of Central students are from military families due to the close proximity to Fort Benning, GA.

Academics 
Central High School offers a variety of challenges courses and classes for its students. Central students are offered dual enrollment courses, advanced placement courses, and honors courses. Overall, Central's rankings within the state of Alabama is 94th, 7,097th in the United States, and 3rd in the Columbus, GA Metro area schools. CHS also ranks 80th in graduation rate in Alabama at 97%, and tied for 5,287th in the country.

Central High School students fell on the 46.9% percentile on the ACT according to US News, which is above the average expectation for the United States. CHS ranked 17th for diversity out of 382 high schools in the state  Alabama. 13% of Central students are enrolled in AP Courses. The average ACT score for Central Phenix City is a 22, and the average SAT score is a 1010. The reading proficiency is a 41%, and a 39% for math.

History 
Central High School was previously established in more of the center of the city across from the Phenix City Public Library until being reestablished to its current location. Central's enrollment in 1988–1989 school year was 903, and its enrollment has grown ever since. The enrollment ranks 10th among Alabama high schools and has been in the top 25 ever since the 2008–2009 school year.

Central is rivals with multiple school such as Auburn High School, Smiths Station High School, Russell County High School, and Opelika High School. The Red Devils and Bulldogs rivalry is seen as the biggest amongst the list since they have met 80 times with the series being split 47-33 Central.

Athletics 
The Central Phenix City Red Devils is ranked 13th best for athletes in the state of Alabama. The school offers man various sports such as: Girls and boys basketball, soccer, tennis, wresting; as well as softball, volleyball, baseball, football, and flag football.

Football 
For football, Central Phenix City is one of the most rich programs around. They have claimed two state titles in 1993 and 2018. Their all-time record in football is 598-369-33 and a winning percentage of 62%. Central also claims 17 region titles, a 170-60 region record, 132 All-State players, and 13 NFL players. The Red Devils have spent 27 weeks ranked number 1 in the state of Alabama under the AHSAA.

Central's football team was founded in 1928 and has had 95 full football seasons, 65 of those being winning seasons and 30 being losing seasons. Their longest winning streak is 14 which spans from 8/25/2018 to 12/5/2018 which was the season of their 2018 state title. The Red Devils also have an impressive playoff resume with a record of 48-33 all time and a 2–2 record in the Finals.

Boys' basketball 
Central Phenix City is not a one sport school as they are also impressive in basketball. Although they possess no state titles, they do have multiple tournament appearances and a winning recrd in the tournament. The Red Devils have appeared in the tournament in the following years: 1943, 1944, 1955, 1957, 1958, 1959, 1960, 1962, 1963, 1978, 1981, 1984, 1986, 1991, 1999, 2003, 2009, 2010, 2016, and 2018. They also have won multiple Area Championships Those titles are as followed: 1978, 1981, 1984, 1986, 1991, 1993, 1995, 1999, 2002, 2003, 2009, 2010, 2011, 2014, 2015, 2016, 2017, 2018, and 2019. Central also possesses 2 District Titles: 1944, and 1962 from the years districts were in place (1923-1963).

The Red Devils' overall record in the Regional Tournament is 124–82. (1994-Current):They have a 29–16 record in the Area, 10–6 record in Sub-Regional, and a 18–8 record in the Regionals. Their overall record in the State Tournament is 9-20. They have a 6–7 record in the 1st Round, a 1–5 record in the 2d Round, a 2- Record in the Semi-Finals, and a 0–2 record in the Finals.

Baseball 
Central's Baseball team has been historically good. Most of all in recent years wth their state title from 2022 under first-year head coach A.J. Kohoe. In 2022, Central High School went 30–10 in total throughout the season and playoffs. They defeated Hewitt-Trussville High School 2–1 in the series to claim their school's first Baseball State Title.

The Red Devils' worst season in recent years was 2019 wen they went 15–12. The last loosing season for CHS was 2013 when they went 32–47. Over the past 10 seasons, the Red Devils have produced a record of 254–165.

Notable alumni 
 Jeremiah Castille, NFL cornerback for the Tampa Bay Buccaneers
 Bryan Hebson, MLB pitcher for the Montreal Expos
 Cordaro Howard, NFL guard for the Buffalo Bills
 Billy Jackson, NFL running back for the Kansas City Chiefs
 James Joseph, NFL running back for the Philadelphia Eagles
 Herman Lee, NFL offensive tackle for Chicago Bears
 Woodrow Lowe, NFL linebacker for the San Diego Chargers
 Reggie Lowe, NFL defensive end for the Jacksonville Jaguars
 Triandos Luke, NFL wide receiver for the Denver Broncos
 J. D. McKissic, NFL running back for the Washington Commanders
 Rakeem Nunez-Roches, NFL nosetackle for the Tampa Bay Buccaneers

References 

High schools in Alabama